Peter Samuel Heine (28 June 1928 – 4 February 2005) was a South African cricketer who played in fourteen Test matches between 1955 and 1962. On his Test debut, he took five wickets in the first innings against England at Lord's in 1955.

Life and career
A fast bowler renowned for his consummate hostility, he formed a potent Test combination with Neil Adcock. Heine picked up 277 first-class wickets at an average of 21.38, including a haul of 8 for 92 for Orange Free State against Transvaal in Welkom in 1954–55. He played for North-Eastern Transvaal in 1951–52 and 1952–53, Orange Free State in 1953–54 and 1954–55, and Transvaal from 1955–56 to 1964–65.

While batting in the match between Orange Free State and Natal at the Ramblers Cricket Club Ground in Bloemfontein in January 1955, Heine straight-drove a ball from Hugh Tayfield out of the ground. It was estimated at the time to have travelled 180 yards before landing, but it was not measured.

Heine died on 4 February 2005 due to cardiac arrest in a private hospital in Pretoria. He was the brother of tennis player Bobbie Heine Miller.

See also
 List of South Africa cricketers who have taken five-wicket hauls on Test debut

References

Notes
 Subramanyam, P. "Peter Heine dead." The Hindu, 6 February 2005.

External links
 

1928 births
2005 deaths
South Africa Test cricketers
South African cricketers
Free State cricketers
Gauteng cricketers
Northerns cricketers
Cricketers who have taken five wickets on Test debut
Afrikaner people